Ian Bailey may refer to:

Ian Bailey (author) (born 1959), head buyer and later financial director of Games Workshop
Ian Bailey (British Army soldier) (born 1959), Corporal in the Parachute Regiment
Ian Bailey (footballer) (born 1956), English footballer
Ian Bailey (journalist), a suspect in the 1996 death of Sophie Toscan du Plantier

See also
 Eion Bailey (born 1976), American actor